Burnaby North is a provincial electoral district for the Legislative Assembly of British Columbia, Canada.

History

MLAs

Election results 

|-

|}

|-

|-
 
|NDP
|Pietro Calendino
|align="right"|5,992
|align="right"|29.45%
|align="right"|
|align="right"|$32,684

|-
 
|NDP
|Pietro Calendino
|align="right"|8,926
|align="right"|45.47%
|align="right"|
|align="right"|$43,634

|-

|Natural Law
|Derek Nadeau
|align="right"|62
|align="right"|0.32%
|align="right"|
|align="right"|$122

|-
 
|NDP
|Barry Jones
|align="right"|9,809
|align="right"|48.43%
|align="right"|
|align="right"|$28,085
|-

References

External links 
BC Stats
Results of 2001 election (pdf)
2001 Expenditures (pdf)
Results of 1996 election
1996 Expenditures
Results of 1991 election
1991 Expenditures
Website of the Legislative Assembly of British Columbia

British Columbia provincial electoral districts
Politics of Burnaby
Provincial electoral districts in Greater Vancouver and the Fraser Valley